Felgyő is a village in Csongrád county, in the Southern Great Plain region of southern Hungary.

Geography

Sources
 Györffy György, 1963–1998: Az Árpád-kori Magyarország történeti földrajza. I–IV. Bp.
 Csajághy György, 1998: A felgyői avar síp és történeti háttere
 Csongrád megye építészeti emlékei (Szerkesztette: Tóth Ferenc dr.), Szeged, 2000 

Populated places in Csongrád-Csanád County